Simba Sports Club is a football club based in Kariakoo, Dar es Salaam Tanzania,

Founded in 1936, It started as a broke away club from another giant football team in Tanzania, Dar Young Africans and was first named Queens, in honor of her Majesty, the Queen of England. The Club had several name changes from Queens to Eagles, then Sunderland and in 1971 it was finally renamed Simba (Swahili for "Lion").

Simba SC has won 22 league titles and five domestic cups and has participated in CAF Champions League multiple times. They are also one of the biggest clubs in East Africa, having won the CECAFA Club Championship six times.

Simba plays their home games at the Benjamin Mkapa Stadium. In 2022, Simba was the fastest growing Instagram account among football clubs, with 1.9 million followers and a growth of 89% from the previous year.

The club is one of the richest in East Africa, with a total budget of TSh 6.1 billion (equivalent to $5.3 million) unveiled for the 2019/2020 season.

Honours

Domestic 
Tanzanian Premier League
 Winner (22): 1965, 1966, 1973, 1976, 1977, 1978, 1979, 1980, 1993, 1994, 1995, 2001, 2002, 2003, 2004, 2007, 2009–10, 2011–12, 2017–18, 2018–19, 2019–20, 2020–21

Nyerere Cup
 Winner (3): 1984, 1995, 2000
FAT Cup
 Winner (4): 1995, 2016–17, 2019–20, 2020–2021
Runners-up (3): 1974, 1998, 2000 
Dar es Salaam League
 Winner (2): 1944, 1946Tusker Cup Winner (5): 2001, 2002, 2003, 2005, 2005
Runners-up (1): 2006Community Shield Winner (9): 2002, 2003, 2005, 2011, 2012, 2017, 2018, 2019, 2020
Runners-up (2): 2001, 2010, 2021Mapinduzi Cup Winner (3): 2011, 2015, 2022
Runners-up (5): 2014, 2017, 2019, 2020, 2021

 Continental CECAFA Club Championship Winners (6): 1974, 2020, 1991, 1992, 1995, 1996, 2002
Runners-up (6): 1975, 1952, 1978, 1981, 2003, 2011, 2018CAF Cup Runners-up (1): 1993

Colours and badge

Players

 Current squad 

Coaching staff

Management

Performance in CAF competitions
The highest success that Simba achieved was reaching the final of the CAF Cup in 1993, where they lost to Stella Club of Côte d'Ivoire. It was the highest continental achievement by a Tanzanian team to date. In 2003 Simba beat the then-reigning champions Zamalek of Egypt in the CAF Champions League second round of qualifiers to qualify to the group stages, after having beat Santos of South Africa in the first round.CAF Champions League: 11 appearances2002 – First Round
2003 – Group stage (Top 8)
2004 – Preliminary Round
2005 – First Round
2008 – First Round

2011 – Special play-off for Group stage
2013 – Preliminary Round
2018–19 – Quarter-finals
2019–20 – Preliminary Round 
2020–21 – Quarter-finals

2021–22 – Second RoundAfrican Cup of Champions Clubs: 9 appearances1974 – Semi-finals
1976 – Second Round
1977 – Second Round
1978 – Second Round
1979 – Second Round
1980 – Second Round

1981 – First Round
1994 – Quarter-Finals
1995 – Second RoundCAF Confederation Cup: 6 appearances2007 – Preliminary Round
2010 – Second Round
2011 – Play-off
2012 – Second Round 
2018 – First Round
2021–22 – Quarter-finalsCAF Cup: 2 appearances1993 – Finalist1997 – First RoundCAF Cup Winners' Cup: 3 appearances'''

1985 – Second Round
1996 – Second Round
2001 – Second Round

Notes

References

External links
 
 
 

Simba S.C.
Association football clubs established in 1936
Sport in Dar es Salaam
1936 establishments in Tanganyika
Simba Sports Club